Canada Goose Holdings Inc. is a Canadian holding company of winter clothing manufacturers. The company was founded in 1957 by Sam Tick, under the name Metro Sportswear Ltd. Canada Goose markets a wide range of jackets, parkas, vests, hats, gloves, shells and other apparel through various avenues, both wholesale and direct to customer with their own retail stores.

History
In 1957, Polish-Jewish immigrant Sam Tick founded the company that would eventually become Canada Goose, under the name Metro Sportswear. The company's first products were wool vests, raincoats, and snowsuits. Tick's son-in-law David Reiss joined Metro Sportswear in 1972 and introduced a down-filling machine that allowed Metro to more efficiently produce winter jackets. By the late 1970s, the company was providing parkas to police, park rangers, and other public sector workers. It also sold designs to larger apparel manufacturers like L.L. Bean and Eddie Bauer. In 1982, Reiss succeeded Tick as the company's CEO. In 1985, Reiss acquired a majority stake in the company and changed its name to Snow Goose.

In 1997, David's son Dani Reiss joined the company, initially working in sales. In 2000, at Dani Reiss's urging, the company changed its name from Snow Goose to Canada Goose. The following year, Dani Reiss took over for his father as Canada Goose's new CEO. Under Reiss's leadership, the company made an effort to expand into Europe, selling its coats to boutiques in France and Germany.

2001–present

Under Dani Reiss' leadership, the company discontinued its private label operations to focus mainly on consumer products. The manufacturing  continued solely in Canada. The business saw rapid growth around the turn of the millennium and revenues increased from roughly $3 million in 1991 to roughly $17.5 million in 2008, reflecting increased sales in Scandinavia and in Canada.

In 2010 Canada Goose opened an office in Stockholm, Sweden, for its European operations. In 2011, Canada Goose acquired a new plant in Winnipeg, Manitoba, Canada. As global growth continued, Canada Goose moved its Winnipeg operations into a larger facility in 2013.

In December 2013, Boston-based private equity firm Bain Capital acquired a 70% equity stake in Canada Goose at a $250 million valuation. The deal included a commitment to keep manufacturing in Canada. At the time, the company had grown to approximately 1,000 employees and had recently opened new manufacturing plants in Toronto and Winnipeg. In December 2014, Canada Goose opened a showroom and a sales office in New York City. From 2001 to 2014, the company's sales revenue had grown from $3 million to $200 million. Canada Goose also acquired a factory in the former city of York in Toronto formerly owned by ACCO Brands' Hilroy stationery.

In December 2014, Canada Goose opened a showroom and an office in New York City. In January 2015, Canada Goose acquired a second manufacturing facility in Scarborough from a contractor. In November 2015, Canada Goose opened a second factory in Winnipeg significantly increasing its manufacturing capacity. That year the company revenue was reported to be about $200 million, It hired approximately 150 new staff members to work at these plants.  In late 2016, Canada Goose opened a store in Toronto's Yorkdale Shopping Centre.

The company announced preparations in November 2016 for an initial public offering, reporting that it generated $291 million in revenue and $27 million in profit in 2016 and had $278 million in debt. On March 16, 2017, shares of the company began trading on the Toronto Stock Exchange and New York Stock Exchange with the ticker symbol GOOS. The IPO was composed of 20 million shares selling for around $13 per share, and raised approximately $255 million in new revenue.

In June 2017, Canada Goose opened its first manufacturing facility in Quebec, a 95,000 square foot facility in Boisbriand. In October 2017, Canada Goose opened its second United States flagship store on the Magnificent Mile in Chicago.
 A third Winnipeg-based Canada Goose manufacturing plant opened in September 2018. This facility brought Canada Goose's employee count in Winnipeg to 1,700 workers. Two months later, the company expanded into China, despite calls to boycott Canadian products over the arrest of Huawei CFO Meng Wanzhou in Canada. It established a store in Beijing, opening in December 2018. 

Despite their high cost, Canada Goose's fur-trimmed parkas have become "almost the uniform of the inner city among 16-to-24 year olds" in Canada, according to one president of a market research firm. Woodchurch High School in Birkenhead, England has banned jackets from Canada Goose, Pyrenex, and Moncler in order to "poverty-proof the school environment", in response to disadvantaged students feeling pressure from their wealthier peers with such coats.

In 2018, robbers on mopeds did a smash-and-grab on a Canada Goose store on Regent Street in London. In January 2019, several people were robbed of their Canada Goose coats in Chicago.

In May 2019, the company opened its eighth Canadian production facility and first in Montreal. At this time, the company had grown to approximately 3,800 employees and its apparel was being sold in 40 countries.

Marketing 

The brand is best known for its distinctive red, white and blue circular logo, which is a "reverse image of the North Pole with the white representing the ocean while the islands are depicted by blue patches, encircled by lines of longitude and latitude to approximate the look and feel of a traditional Arctic Map. The outer ring of the logo contains "CANADA GOOSE" on the top and "ARCTIC PROGRAM" on the bottom, while each side has five maple leaves. The badge is usually placed on the upper arm of a coat or jacket. Canada Goose CEO Dani Reiss says “The badge makes people feel like they belong to a club” and describes Canada Goose as the “Swiss watch of apparel” and the “Land Rover of outerwear”. A monochrome all-black variant of the logo is found on the brand's Black Label Collection, originally to cater to New Yorkers who find the standard logo too ubiquitous. The logo is nearly identical in design to that of the United States Antarctic Program.

In partnership with Polar Bears International (PBI), jackets under this collection feature the distinctive PBI royal blue color developed by the Pantone Color Institute, and a PBI badge on the upper arm.Under Canada Goose CEO Dani Reiss, the brand has been extremely careful on what offerings to release, avoiding the tendency to place their logo on numerous products nor licensing their logo to outside manufacturers as such quick short-term profits would have diluted the brand in the long run. At a time when many other garment companies have relocated manufacturing to Asia to take advantage of lower wages, Canada Goose has refused to outsource and instead setup sewing schools in Winnipeg, Montreal, and Toronto. The company products continue to be manufactured in Canada, not only for maintaining production quality and local jobs, but also because according to the company they “are an ambassador for our country on a global stage.”

The company sponsors several film festivals including the Sundance Film Festival in Utah, and Toronto International Film Festival.

Canada Goose products are also worn by researchers and workers in remote, cold-weather regions. Canada Goose (and Carhartt) supply parkas for participants in the United States Antarctic Program (USAP).

Competitors 
Canada Goose has several competitors in the high-end outerwear market, a segment which has grown considerably between 2011 and 2017. Moose Knuckles, contrasting with Canada Goose's low key advertising which relies heavily on social media, has run controversial ads, including the FUQ (Fédération unilatérale du Québec) parodying the terrorist separatist group Front de libération du Québec (FLQ) which received complaints and resulting in the brand being dropped by a retailer, and another one mimicking Kate Upton's Sports Illustrated cover where she wore a white Canada Goose Parka. Mackage, Moncler (with €1bn in turnover and 80% of their business linked to Down products), Nobis (whose founder Robin Yates was previously a vice president at Canada Goose), Parajumpers, and Woolrich are also frequently mentioned rivals.

In January 2012, Canada Goose launched a lawsuit against International Clothiers in the Federal Court of Canada for trademark infringement. Canada Goose alleged International Clothiers of intentionally designing a logo and positioning it on jackets to mimic the Canada Goose Arctic Program trademark. The International Clothiers product lines in question were the foreign-manufactured Canada Weather Gear and Super Triple Goose. Canada Goose claimed that unfair business practices were used including publishing print advertisements to promote the jackets as Canada Goose products. A settlement was reached in November 2012.

Triple F.A.T. Goose, owned by Turbo Holdings, a privately held company, with other brands Vaiden, and First Down, compete.

Counterfeiting
Due to the high price and popularity of Canada Goose products, they are frequently counterfeited. Compared to real Canada Goose coats which use duck down insulation and coyote fur trim, counterfeit products use cheaper and less effective materials and insulators. Knockoffs are usually manufactured in Asia and retail for around $100–200 CAD, compared to the authentic coats which sell for up to $800 CAD. Fakes are frequently sold through the internet.

To combat counterfeiting, Canada Goose frequently reminds buyers that their offerings are only sold via authorized retailers or the company's stores, and has set up a web page enlisting the public's help to identify questionable online sites which is in turn forwarded to the RCMP to shut them down. Fake Canada Goose Jackets are also one of the many counterfeit items being handled by Project Chargeback, a collaboration between the Canadian Anti-Fraud Centre, credit-card companies, and banks, to scrutinize online merchant accounts. In 2011, Canada Goose began sewing hologram trademarks into its jackets as proof of authenticity.

In October 2012, Canada Goose won a legal battle against counterfeiters in Sweden. The District Court of Stockholm found five individuals guilty of felony fraud, trademark infringement, and customs offences. The Court sentenced two of the defendants to serve time in prison and awarded Canada Goose damages of 701,000 SEK (approximately CAD$105,000).

Canada Goose, while spending a considerable amount of time and money to fight counterfeiters, has admitted that counterfeits have raised awareness for the brand, particularly in China.

Treatment of coyotes and geese
The company's jackets are often filled with down which is purchased by a sub-contractor (Feather Industries Canada) from Hutterite farmers in rural Canada. Some Canada Goose jackets use coyote fur on the hoods, which has caused protests from animal anti-cruelty activists due to the alleged use of leg-hold in addition to other types of traps.

In 2010 People for the Ethical Treatment of Animals (PETA), an American animal rights group, criticized Canadian politician (and later Prime Minister) Justin Trudeau and his family for wearing Canada Goose products in a family Christmas photo because of the company's use of fur.

In December 2012, Toronto Police were searching for a suspect who was likely an anti-fur activist after she "destroyed thousands of dollars worth of merchandise at several high-end stores by smearing fur garments [including those by Canada Goose] with petroleum jelly", rendering them unsalable.

Canada Goose CEO Dani Reiss was criticized in 2014 by blogger Shannon Kornelsen for refusing to meet then-11-year-old Jasmine Polsinelli, an anti-fur activist who wanted Reiss to reconsider trapping coyotes for their fur.

Following the public trading of shares in Canada Goose on the New York Stock Exchange in March 2017, PETA purchased 230 shares in the company so it could propose a shareholder resolution at Canada Goose's next annual meeting to "ask them to abandon the cruel use of fur and feathers."

A February 2019 article in Newsweek addressed the issue of the use of coyote fur on the hoods of some Canada Goose jackets as well as the goose down in the lining of all their jackets. The author indicated that Canada Goose stated that it obtains the fur from sources that trap it ethically, in accordance with Canada's Agreement of International Humane Trapping Standards (AIHTS) or by similar regulations in the U.S., a policy called Best Management Practices (BMP). The author detailed how when a claim was taken to the Competition Bureau of Canada that the term "humane" was being used misleadingly, the Bureau dismissed the claim in a single-page letter without justification, and have since fought the public-records disclosure requests of the claim filant, Animal Justice. After a long discussion of the various trapping practices, noting that two of the traps are banned in dozens of countries and the AIHTS was implemented largely to negotiate continued export to Europe while keeping those traps in use, the author of the piece provided this conclusion:

In June 2021, Canada Goose announced that it would stop making its products with fur by the end of 2022 after years of backlash over its use of coyote fur.

In popular culture
Canada Goose has used Hollywood to promote its products. The jackets have been worn in several films, starting with The Day After Tomorrow.  American model Kate Upton appeared on the cover of the 2013 Sports Illustrated Swimsuit edition in a bikini bottom and a Canada Goose parka.  Product placement with celebrities was part of the marketing strategy when it went international in 2010.

In 2016, rapper Lil Uzi Vert released a mixtape featuring a song titled "Canadian Goose".

Professional athletes have also promoted Canada Goose. During Boston Red Sox designated hitter David Ortiz's final trip to Toronto during the 2016 Major League Baseball season, Toronto Blue Jays players José Bautista and Edwin Encarnación each gave Ortiz a custom-made Canada Goose jacket, valued at US$1000.

In 2020, amidst the COVID-19 pandemic, actor Ryan Reynolds and Canada Goose donated parkas for 300 students in Arctic Bay, Nunavut.

See also
 Moncler

References

External links 

Canada Goose 

Canadian clothing
Clothing brands of Canada
Clothing retailers of Canada
1957 establishments in Ontario
Canadian companies established in 1957
Clothing companies established in 1957
Companies listed on the Toronto Stock Exchange
High fashion brands
Outdoor clothing brands
2017 initial public offerings
Manufacturing companies based in Toronto